Fred Junior Miller Jr. (born February 6, 1973) is a former American football offensive tackle. He most recently played for the Chicago Bears of the National Football League (NFL). He was drafted by the St. Louis Rams in the fifth round of the 1996 NFL Draft. He played college football at Baylor.

NFL playing career
Miller was expected to struggle with Tennessee Titans rookie sensation Jevon Kearse in Super Bowl XXXIV, having given up several sacks to Kearse in the regular season match up between the teams. In Super Bowl XXXIV, Miller gave up no sacks (with the exception of one that was negated by a Kearse penalty) in the Rams' 23–16 championship win. Miller had the distinction of making the Rams' first reception of the game on a tipped pass, an unusual accomplishment for an offensive lineman. It would be Miller's final game with the Rams, as he signed with the Rams' Super Bowl opponent—the Titans—for the 2000 season.

In 2005, Chicago Bears teammate Olin Kreutz broke Miller's jaw in an altercation. The team had originally stated, "Fred Miller broke his jaw while getting out of bed in the middle of the night." Both players were fined $50,000 by the NFL.

On February 18, 2008 the Bears released him. He was re-signed by the Bears a week into the regular season on September 10.

Coaching career
Miller was an assistant coach of the varsity football team at North Shore Country Day School in Winnetka, Illinois for the 2011 and 2012 seasons. In 2011, he helped the school to a 9–2 record and one of the best seasons in school history, a mere three seasons after the team finished their 2008 season with an 0–9 record. He also coached for the North Shore Titans youth football program.

References

1973 births
Living people
American football offensive tackles
Baylor Bears football players
Chicago Bears players
St. Louis Rams players
Tennessee Titans players
High school football coaches in Illinois
Players of American football from Houston